Aclarubicin (INN) or aclacinomycin A is an anthracycline drug that is used in the treatment of cancer. Soil bacteria Streptomyces galilaeus can produce aclarubicin. It can induce histone eviction from chromatin upon intercalation.

References

Anthracyclines
Topoisomerase inhibitors